In computing timestamping refers to the use of an electronic timestamp to provide a temporal order among a set of events.

Timestamping techniques are used in a variety of computing fields, from network management and  computer security to concurrency control. For instance, a heartbeat network uses timestamping to monitor the nodes on a high availability computer cluster.

Timestamping computer files (updating  the timestamp in the per-file  metadata every time a file is modified) makes it possible to use efficient build automation tools.

See also
 Trusted timestamping
 Timestamp-based concurrency control

References

Computer network security
Concurrency control
Transaction processing